para-Chloromethamphetamine (also known as 4-chloromethamphetamine and 4-CMA) is a stimulant that is the N-methyl derivative and prodrug of the neurotoxic drug para-chloroamphetamine (4-CA). It has been found to decrease serotonin in rats. Further investigation into the long-term effects of chloroamphetamines discovered that administration of 4-CMA caused a prolonged reduction in the levels of serotonin and the activity of tryptophan hydroxylase in the brain one month after injection of a single dose of the drug.

Another study on rats found that 4-chloromethamphetamine was more potent at inducing conditioned taste aversion than methamphetamine.

4-Chloromethamphetamine was further investigated in the 1960s along with 4-CA and it was noted that they differed from their parent amphetamine and methamphetamine substances by exhibiting only a slight central stimulant effect in both animals and humans and that they acted like antidepressants rather than stimulants.

4-Chloromethamphetamine was identified outside of the laboratory for the first time at the Tomorrowland festival edition 2015, where a tablet was found in possession of a drug dealer (see picture).

See also 
 3-Chloromethamphetamine
 4-Bromoamphetamine
 4-Fluoroamphetamine
 4-Fluoromethamphetamine
 4-Iodoamphetamine

References 

Chlorobenzenes
Designer drugs
Stimulants
Methamphetamines
Neurotoxins
Serotonin-norepinephrine-dopamine releasing agents